The George H. Buck Jr. Jazz Foundation was created by George Buck in the 1980s to maintain the catalog of his jazz record labels. The catalog includes dixieland jazz, swing, blues, rhythm and blues, gospel, and cabaret music.

History
Jazzology Records began when Buck commissioned a recording session in New York City on August 16, 1949. He was a college student who had been hosting a radio show for two years called Jazzology. The session consisted of Wild Bill Davison on coronet, Jimmy Archey on trombone, Tony Parenti on clarinet, Art Hodes on piano, Pops Foster on double bass, and Arthur Trappier on drums. He started GHB Records in the 1950s when he bought an album from Paradox Records, which was closing. He planned to use GHB for New Orleans jazz and Jazzology for Chicago jazz. During the 1960s he bought the labels Circle, Jazz Crusade, Icon, Mono, and Southland. With help from a bank loan and loyal customers, he bought World Transcriptions, a company that since the 1930 had provided prerecorded radio programs to independent jazz stations. During the 1970s and 1980s, he bought Audiophile Records, Progressive, Paramount, Monmouth-Evergreen, American Music Records, and Lang-Worth Transcription Company. In the 1980s, Buck moved Jazzology from Atlanta to New Orleans. He and his wife lived in the French Quarter and ran the Palm Court Jazz Café.

Notable musicians

 Red Allen
 Alvin Alcorn
 Albert Ammons
 Jimmy Archey
 Louis Armstrong
 Paul Barbarin
 Sweet Emma Barrett
 Ray Bauduc
 Sidney Bechet
 Barney Bigard
 Sharkey Bonano
 Big Bill Broonzy
 Pete Brown
 George Brunis
 Albert Burbank
 Raymond Burke
 Gus Cannon
 Rosemary Clooney
 Eddie Condon
 Bob Crosby
 Joe Darensbourg
 Cow Cow Davenport
 Wild Bill Davison
 Vic Dickenson
 Baby Dodds
 Johnny Dodds
 Tommy Dorsey
 Duke Ellington
 Don Ewell
 Pops Foster
 Pete Fountain
 Cié Frazier
 Bud Freeman
 George Guesnon
 Edmond Hall
 Fletcher Henderson
 Milt Hinton
 Art Hodes
 Kid Howard
 Blind Lemon Jefferson
 Bunk Johnson
 Pete Johnson
 Hank Jones
 Jonah Jones
 Lee Konitz
 Tommy Ladnier
 George Lewis
 Meade Lux Lewis
 Cripple Clarence Lofton
 Max Kaminsky
 Brownie & Stick McGee
 Jimmy McPartland
 Eddie Miller
 Punch Miller
 Jelly Roll Morton
 Ray Nance
 Albert Nicholas
 Wooden Joe Nicholas
 Hot Lips Page
 Tony Parenti
 Charlie Patton
 Piano Red
 Billie Pierce
 Sammy Price
 Alton Purnell
 Ma Rainey
 Luckey Roberts
 Jim Robinson
 Pee Wee Russell
 Harry Shields
 Rex Stewart
 Sonny Stitt
 Maxine Sullivan
 Ralph Sutton
 Roosevelt Sykes
 Mel Tormé
 Joe Turner
 Kid Thomas Valentine
 Ben Webster
 Dick Wellstood
 George Wettling
 Johnny Wiggs
 Lee Wiley
 Dave "Fat Man" Williams
 Robert Pete Williams
 Jimmy Yancey

References

External links
 George H. Buck Jr. Jazz Foundation

Jazz record labels
Companies based in New Orleans